Eric Jason Thomas (born September 11, 1964) is a former professional American football player, who played cornerback for nine seasons for the Cincinnati Bengals, New York Jets and Denver Broncos. He went to the Pro Bowl after the 1988 season. Eric 
attended Tulane University.

References 

1964 births
Living people
American football cornerbacks
Tulane Green Wave football players
New York Jets players
Denver Broncos players
American Conference Pro Bowl players
Players of American football from Tucson, Arizona